Sir William Gillow Gibbes Austen Young  (born 14 April 1952) was a Supreme Court Judge, former President of the Court of Appeal of New Zealand, and, briefly, a judge of the Dubai International Financial Centre Courts. He was appointed to the Supreme Court by Attorney-General Chris Finlayson in June 2010, taking effect from 1 July.

Early life, family, and early career
Born in Christchurch on 14 April 1952, Young was educated at Christ's College, University of Canterbury (LLB (Hons) in 1974) and University of Cambridge (PhD) in the United Kingdom with a thesis Duress and abuse of inequality of bargaining position. In 1979, he and his wife, Susan, were married, and they went on to have three children.

After obtaining his PhD, Young worked in the Christchurch law firm R A Young Hunter & Co, before moving to the independent bar to become a barrister sole in 1988. Young was made a Queen's Counsel in 1991 and acted in several high-profile cases, including the Winebox Inquiry of the 1990s.

Judge
Young was appointed a High Court Judge in Christchurch in 1997, a Court of Appeal Judge when the Supreme Court was created in 2004, and to the position of President in January 2006. Young was appointed a Judge of the Supreme Court with effect from 1 July 2010. Young in R v Wanhalla described model jury directions in a criminal trial on the standard of proof required.

In the 2007 Queen's Birthday Honours, Young was appointed a Distinguished Companion of the New Zealand Order of Merit, for services as president of the Court of Appeal. In 2009, following the restoration of titular honours by the New Zealand government, he accepted redesignation as a Knight Companion.

Young was appointed a judge of the Dubai International Financial Centre Courts in July 2022, but resigned less than a month later citing the risk of 'adverse perceptions' in light of concerns raised by human rights campaigners about foreign judicial appointments allegedly being used to legitimise the United Arab Emirates political regime.

On 7 November 2022 he was sworn in as a judge of the Court of Appeal of Samoa.

Non-judicial involvement
While a barrister, Young was involved with the New Zealand Law Society educational programme and, since appointment to the bench, with the Institute of Judicial Studies, being the primary author of its Criminal Jury Trials Bench Book. He wrote "Summing Up to Juries – What Jury Research says about Current Rules and Practice" [2003] Crim LR 665 and co-authored a  chapter in Witness Testimony: Psychological, Investigative and Evidential Perspectives (Oxford University Press 26 October 2006).

References

Alumni of the University of Cambridge
Court of Appeal of New Zealand judges
Knights Companion of the New Zealand Order of Merit
University of Canterbury alumni
1952 births
Living people
20th-century New Zealand judges
People educated at Christ's College, Christchurch
Supreme Court of New Zealand judges
New Zealand King's Counsel
New Zealand writers
21st-century New Zealand judges
New Zealand judges on the courts of Samoa